The Detroit Red Wings are a professional ice hockey team based in Detroit, Michigan. They are members of the Atlantic Division of the National Hockey League's (NHL) Eastern Conference. The Red Wings franchise has been a part of the NHL since 1926, making them one of the "Original Six" clubs. Originally named the Detroit Cougars, the team was renamed to the Detroit Falcons in 1930; in 1932, the team's name was changed to the Detroit Red Wings and has remained the same since. As of the conclusion of the 2014–15 NHL season, 897 players have played for the franchise; of them, 91 of them are goaltenders, while 806 are skaters.

Since its inception, the team has had 36 captains, including Hall of Famers Sid Abel, Ted Lindsay, Red Kelly, Gordie Howe, Alex Delvecchio, Steve Yzerman, and Nicklas Lidstrom. Seven players have had the honor of having their uniform number officially retired from play; one of them is Yzerman, who played for the Red Wings from 1983 to 2006, and was the longest-serving captain in North American major league sports, with a tenure of 19 years. Yzerman led his team to three Stanley Cups and was the recipient of several awards, including the Ted Lindsay Award and Lester Patrick Trophy for his outstanding play and contributions to the sport. A total of 58 Detroit players have been inducted into the Hockey Hall of Fame.

Gordie Howe holds regular season records for most games played (1687), most points (1809), and most goals (786). Howe was a member of a Stanley Cup-winning team four times with the Red Wings and his uniform number 9 was retired by the club. Yzerman holds the regular season record for most assists with 1063, while Bob Probert's 2090 penalty minutes in the regular season is also a club record. Yzerman also leads the team in points and goals scored in the playoffs with 185 and 70, respectively. Lidstrom holds team marks with 129 assists and 263 games played in the playoffs. Darren McCarty leads the team with 228 post season penalty minutes.

Amongst goaltenders, Terry Sawchuk holds the regular season lead in games played (734), wins (351), losses (243), ties (132), and shutouts (85). Sawchuk won the Stanley Cup three times in Detroit, was inducted into the Hockey Hall of Fame, and had his uniform number 1 retired by the team. Chris Osgood, who also won the Stanley Cup three times with the Red Wings, leads club goaltenders in many playoff statistics. Osgood's 110 games played, 67 wins, and 14 shutouts are all team records in the playoffs. Sawchuk and Osgood are tied for the lead with 37 post season losses.

Key 

 Appeared in a Red Wings game during the 2020–21 NHL season or is still part of the organization.
 Stanley Cup winner, retired jersey or elected to the Hockey Hall of Fame

Statistics are complete to the end of the 2017–18 NHL season.

Goaltenders

Skaters

Notes 

 Beginning in the 2005–06 season, ties are no longer possible. At the same time, the league began tracking overtime losses for goaltenders.
 Save percentage did not become an official NHL statistic until the 1982–83 season. Therefore, goaltenders who played before 1982 do not have official save percentages.
 The seasons column lists the first year of the season of the player's first game and the last year of the season of the player's last game. For example, a player who played one game in the 2000–01 season would be listed as playing with the team from 2000–01, regardless of what calendar year the game occurred within.''

References 
General
 
 
 
 
 
 

Specific

 List
Detroit Red Wings players
players